Tin Lok Lane, is a street in Wan Chai between Hennessy Road and Wan Chai Road.

Location
Tin Lok Lane runs north-south from Hennessy Road to Wan Chai Road. After reaching Wan Chai Road, the street continues southward as Morrison Hill Road.

History
Before Lockhart Road was built, Tin Lok Lane had a beach at Observation Point.

In the 1890s Tin Lok Lane was a narrow street, however, since the 1930s, it became a main road, and there were funeral houses, those funeral houses relocated to other areas after the 1960s.

In the 1930 and 1940s, Hong Kong funeral services used to gather in Wan Chai and closed to the cemetery in Happy Valley. The Hong Kong Funeral Home was located on Wan Chai Road and it stored selling traditional Chinese coffin on Tin Lok Lane. 

The name Tin Lok in Chinese carries the meaning of entering the blissful heaven.

Features
There are some fast food shops, cafes and restaurants.

Transportation
The Happy Valley branch of the Hong Kong Tramways branches out from the main line along Hennessy Road and runs southward through Tin Lok Lane. A tram stop of this branch is located in the street, near its intersection with Hennessy Road.

Wan Chai
Roads on Hong Kong Island